Janek Õiglane (born 25 April 1994 in Rakvere) is an Estonian athlete competing in the decathlon. He has represented Estonia three times at the World Athletics Championships, finishing 19th at the 2015 World Championships in Beijing, achieving 4th place at the 2017 World Championships in London and earning 6th at the 2019 World Championships in Doha. He also won a bronze medal at the 2015 European U23 Championships.
 
His main personal bests are 8405 points in the decathlon (Knoxville, 2022) and 5739 points in the indoor heptathlon (Tallinn, 2016).

International competitions

Personal bests
Outdoor
100 metres – 10.89 (Knoxville 2022)
Long jump – 7.42 (+1.6 m/s) (Tallinn 2017)
Shot put – 15.38 (Rakvere 2019)
High jump – 2.05 (London 2017)
400 metres – 48.80 (Munich 2022)
110 metres hurdles – 14.33 (Knoxville 2022)
Discus throw – 45.94 (Tallinn 2021)
Pole vault – 5.12 (Athens 2022)
Javelin throw – 72.46 (Doha 2019)
1500 metres – 4:34.41 (Rakvere 2016)
Decathlon – 8405 (Knoxville 2022)

Indoor
60 metres – 7.07 (Tallinn 2019)
1000 metres – 2:44.37 (Tallinn 2016)
60 metres hurdles – 8.05 (Tallinn 2022) 
High jump – 2.02 (Tallinn 2016)
Pole vault – 5.19 (Tallinn 2019)
Long jump – 7.34 (Tallinn 2019)
Shot put – 15.50 (Glasgow 2019)
Heptathlon – 6085 (Tallinn 2019)

References

External links

1994 births
Place of birth missing (living people)
Living people
Estonian decathletes
World Athletics Championships athletes for Estonia
Sportspeople from Rakvere
European Athletics Championships medalists
21st-century Estonian people